Thomas Griffiths was an English professional footballer who played in the Southern League for Exeter City as a left half. He also played in the Football League for Clapton Orient.

Personal life 
Griffiths served as a gunner in the Royal Garrison Artillery during the First World War.

Honours 
Blackburn Rovers Reserves

 Lancashire Combination Second Division: 1907–08

References

English footballers
English Football League players
Year of death missing
Leyton Orient F.C. players
British Army personnel of World War I
Association football wing halves
1888 births
Footballers from Liverpool
Clitheroe F.C. players
Blackburn Rovers F.C. players
Exeter City F.C. players
Southern Football League players
Llanelli Town A.F.C. players
Royal Garrison Artillery soldiers
Military personnel from Liverpool